Windows Settings (formerly PC settings) is a component of Microsoft Windows. It allows users to adjust their user preferences, configure their operating system, and manage their connected devices. Microsoft introduced Settings with Windows Server 2012 and Windows 8, and initially intended it to replace the Windows Control Panel, something that has not happened after a decade.

Overview 
The Settings app exposed a very small portion of Windows Control Panel's functionality. Over time, however, it has become the sole user interface and control point for Windows Update (removed from Control Panel) and Windows Hello (never added to Control Panel.) The app categorizes its settings by function, just as the Control Panel did since Windows XP. Unlike the Control Panel, however, it does not offer a unified mode in which the bulk of all available settings assail the app window in a contextually haphazard fashion.

The Windows Settings app is a UWP app, installed in the C:\Windows\ImmersiveControlPanel path. The Windows components in charge of servicing UWP apps also work with this app, but refer to it as Windows.ImmersiveControlPanel.

History 
The first versions of Windows to make the Settings app available were Windows Server 2012 and Windows 8, which Microsoft released to manufacturing on 1 August 2012. Before that, Windows users had to use Windows Control Panel to configure their operating system; they still do, because the Settings app is not as comprehensive. Microsoft has alleged that Settings would eventually replace Control Panel, but , it has not happened.

First generation: PC Settings 

The first generation of the app, called "PC Settings" was included with Windows 8, Windows Server 2012, Windows 8.1, and Windows Server 2012 R2.

On Windows 8, the PC Settings app was designed as a simplified area optimized for use on touchscreen devices. It exposes a small portion of Control Panel functionality on a two-paned full-screen interface. Adding accounts and changing user pictures could only be done from this app. Windows 8.1 improved upon this component to include more options that were previously exclusive to Control Panel, as well as providing more organization and a redesign. It also added a small "Control Panel" link at the bottom of the left pane to allow users to open the Control Panel and access further options.

The categories listed are:
 PC and devices
 Accounts
 OneDrive
 Search and apps
 Privacy
 Network
 Time and language
 Ease of Access
 Update and recovery
 Activate Windows (shows up only if Windows isn't activated)

Second generation: Settings 

The second generation of the app, called "Settings" has been included with all releases of Windows 10 (including Windows 10 Mobile edition), as well as Windows Server 2016, 2019 and 2022. It includes more options that were previously exclusive to the desktop Control Panel. Windows Update, which belonged to the Control Panel prior to Windows 10, now exclusively belong to Settings. The latest version contains the following categories:
 System
 Devices
 Phone (introduced in version 1709)
 Network & Internet
 Personalization
 Apps (introduced in version 1703)
 Accounts
 Time & Language
 Gaming (introduced in version 1607)
 Ease of Access
 Search
 Cortana (introduced in version 1703; removed in version 20H1)
 Privacy
 Update & Security
 Mixed Reality (introduced in version 1703; appears only if a device meeting minimum HoloLens requirements is connected to the PC.)
While most of these categories offer what their name says, the "Update & Security" category contains an amalgam of loosely related items, including: Update, delivery optimization, backup, troubleshooting, recovery, activation, finding lost devices, the developer mode, and the Windows Insider program. Unlike what its name says, it cannot alter any security-related feature of the operating system.

Windows Server 2022 updates some of the visual elements of the app, but not as extensively as Windows 11's version.

Third generation 
On Windows 11, the app has undergone a significant visual redesign, with a new layout, greater translucency, and refreshed icons, following the Fluent Design System. A persistent navigation sidebar has also been added, linking to various groupings of settings within the app.

The Windows 11 settings app contains the following categories:

 System
 Bluetooth & devices
 Network & internet
 Personalization
 Apps
 Accounts
 Time & language
 Gaming
 Accessibility
 Privacy & security
 Windows Update

References

External links  
 What's new in the Windows 10 Creators Update Settings app - Windows Central
 What's new with the Settings app in the Windows 10 Fall Creators Update - Windows Central

2012 software
Computer configuration
Universal Windows Platform apps
Windows components